Throughout Indonesian history, the title of Second Lady or, in an instance, Second Gentleman has been used to refer to the wife or husband of the vice president of Indonesia. While the Constitution of Indonesia does not mention anything about the spouses of the vice president, it continues to hold significant influence in the Indonesian society.

List of title holders

See also
List of vice presidents of Indonesia
First spouses of Indonesia

References

Indonesia
Lists of Indonesian people